The Open Two Person Keelboat at the 2000 Summer Olympics was held from 23.09. to 30 September 2000 in Sydney in Australia. Points were awarded for placement in each race. Eleven races were scheduled and sailed. Each sailor had two discards.

Results

Notes
Points are assigned based on the finishing position in each race (1 for first, 2 for second, etc.).  The points are totalled from the top 10 results of the 11 races, with lower totals being better.  If a sailor was disqualified or did not complete the race, 26 points are assigned for that race (as there were 25 sailors in this competition).

Scoring abbreviations are defined as follows:
OCS – On course side of the starting line
DSQ – Disqualified
DNF – Did Not Finish
DNS – Did Not Start
RDG – Redress Given

References

Sources
Results and weather take from https://web.archive.org/web/20050825083600/http://www.sailing.org/olympics2000/info2000/

Tornado
Star (keelboat) competitions
Unisex sailing at the Summer Olympics